Events from the year 1738 in Ireland.

Incumbent
Monarch: George II

Events
Roxborough Castle in Moy, County Tyrone, built by James Caulfeild, 4th Viscount Charlemont.
Rev. Samuel Madden publishes Reflections and Resolutions Proper for the Gentlemen of Ireland, as to their Conduct for the Service of their Country, as Landlords, as Masters of Families, as Protestants, as Descended from British Ancestors, as Country Gentlemen and Farmers, as Justices of the Peace, as Merchants, as Members of Parliament.

Births
December 2 – Richard Montgomery, soldier, major general in the Continental Army during the Revolutionary War (d. 1775)

Deaths
March 25 – Turlough O'Carolan, blind, itinerant harpist, sometimes styled "The Last of the Bards" (b. 1670)
October 10 – Thomas Sheridan (b. 1687), an Anglican divine, essayist, playwright, poet, schoolmaster and translator
 Undated
 Benjamin Hawkshaw, Irish Anglican divine

References

 
Years of the 18th century in Ireland
Ireland
1730s in Ireland